Mehdi Bazargan (1 September 1907 – 20 January 1995) was an Iranian scholar, academic, long-time pro-democracy activist and head of Iran's interim government. 

One of the leading figures of Iranian Revolution of 1979, he was appointed prime minister in February 1979 by Ayatollah Khomeini, making him Iran's first prime minister after the revolution. He resigned his position in November of the same year, in protest at the US Embassy takeover and as an acknowledgement of his government's failure in preventing it.

He was the head of the first engineering department of University of Tehran.

Early life and education

Bazargan was born into an Azerbaijani family in Tehran on 1 September 1907. His father, Hajj Abbasqoli Tabrizi (died 1954) was a self-made merchant and a religious activist in bazaar guilds.

Bazargan went to France to receive university education through an Iranian government scholarship during the reign of Reza Shah. He attended Lycée Georges Clemenceau in Nantes and was a classmate of Abdollah Riazi. Bazargan then studied thermodynamics and engineering at the École Centrale des Arts et Manufactures (École Centrale Paris).

Following his return to Iran, Bazargan was called up for conscription, and served from 1935 to 1937. According to Houchang Chehabi, Bazargan was firstly tasked with shifting pebbles in a barracks but was then moved to translate technical articles from French.

Career
After his graduation, Bazargan became the head of the first engineering department at Tehran University in the late 1940s. He was a deputy minister under Premier Mohammad Mosaddegh in the 1950s. Bazargan served as the first Iranian head of the National Iranian Oil Company under the administration of Prime Minister Mosaddegh.

Bazargan co-founded the Liberation Movement of Iran in 1961, a party similar in its program to Mossadegh's National Front. Although he accepted the Shah, Mohammad Reza Pahlavi, as the legitimate head of state, he was jailed several times on political grounds. A strong admirer of Mahatma Gandhi, he praised Mahatma Gandhi's ideas and the Indian independence movement in his writings in jail as an ideal example for Iranians.

Iranian Revolution
On 4 February 1979, Bazargan was appointed prime minister of Iran by Ayatollah Khomeini. He was seen as one of the democratic and liberal figureheads of the revolution who came into conflict with the more radical religious leaders – including Khomeini himself – as the revolution progressed. Although pious, Bazargan initially disputed the name Islamic Republic, wanting an Islamic Democratic Republic. He had also been a supporter of the original (non-theocratic) revolutionary draft constitution, and opposed the Assembly of Experts for Constitution and the constitution they wrote that was eventually adopted as Iran's constitution. Seeing his government's lack of power, in March 1979, he submitted his resignation to Ayatollah Khomeini. Khomeini did not accept his resignation, and in April 1979, he and his cabinet members were reported to have escaped an assassination attempt.

Bazargan resigned, along with his cabinet, on 4 November 1979, following the US Embassy takeover and hostage-taking. His resignation was considered a protest against the hostage-taking and a recognition of his government's inability to free the hostages, but it was also clear that his hopes for liberal democracy and an accommodation with the West would not prevail. 

Bazargan continued in Iranian politics as a member of the first Parliament (Majles) of the newly formed Islamic Republic. He openly opposed Iran's cultural revolution and continued to advocate civil rule and democracy. In November 1982, he expressed his frustration with the direction the Islamic Revolution had taken in an open letter to the then speaker of parliament Akbar Hashemi Rafsanjani.

The government has created an atmosphere of terror, fear, revenge and national disintegration. ... What has the ruling elite done in nearly four years, besides bringing death and destruction, packing the prisons and the cemeteries in every city, creating long queues, shortages, high prices, unemployment, poverty, homeless people, repetitious slogans and a dark future?

His term as a member of parliament lasted until 1984. During his term, he served as a lawmaker of the Iran Freedom Movement, which he had founded in 1961, and which was abolished in 1990. In 1985, the Council of Guardians denied Bazargan's petition to run for president.

Views
Bazargan is a respected figure within the ranks of modern Muslim thinkers, known as a representative of liberal-democratic Islamic thought and a thinker who emphasized the necessity of constitutional and democratic policies. In the immediate aftermath of the revolution Bazargan led a faction that opposed the Revolutionary Council dominated by the Islamic Republican Party and personalities such as Ayatollah Mohammad Hossein Beheshti. He opposed the continuation of the Iran–Iraq War and the involvement of Islamists in all aspects of politics, economy and society. Consequently, he faced harassment from militants and young revolutionaries within Iran.

Attacks
During the Pahlavi era, Bazargan's house in Tehran was bombed on 8 April 1978. The underground committee for revenge, a reputed state-financed organization, proclaimed the responsibility of the bombing.

Laws of social evolution
Bazargan is known for some of the earliest work in human thermodynamics, as found in his 1946 chapter "A Physiological Analysis of Human Thermodynamics" and his 1956 book Love and Worship: Human Thermodynamics, the latter of which being written while in prison, in which he attempted to show that religion and worship are a byproduct of evolution, as explained in English naturalist Charles Darwin's On the Origin of Species (1859), and that the true laws of society are based on the laws of thermodynamics.

Death
Bazargan died of a heart attack on 20 January 1995 in Switzerland. He died at a hospital in Zürich after collapsing at the airport. He was travelling to the United States for heart surgery.

Personal life
Bazargan married Malak Tabatabai in 1939. They had five children, two sons and three daughters.

See also
 Intellectual movements in Iran
 Iranian Committee for the Defense of Freedom and Human Rights
 Religious-Nationalists

References

Further reading

External links

20th-century Iranian engineers
1907 births
1995 deaths
École Centrale Paris alumni
Iranian scholars
Gandhians
Politicians from Tehran
Academic staff of the University of Tehran
Iranian expatriates in France
Iranian democracy activists
Iranian dissidents
Prime Ministers of Iran
Foreign ministers of Iran
Government ministers of Iran
People of the Iranian Revolution
Iranian revolutionaries
Iranian people of World War II
Deputies of Tehran, Rey, Shemiranat and Eslamshahr
Members of the 1st Islamic Consultative Assembly
Iranian Azerbaijanis
National Front (Iran) politicians
Iran Party politicians
Council of the Islamic Revolution members
Members of the Iranian Committee for the Defense of Freedom and Human Rights
Members of the Association for Defense of Freedom and the Sovereignty of the Iranian Nation
Secretaries-general of the Freedom Movement of Iran
Freedom Movement of Iran MPs
Burials in Qom
Burials at Fatima Masumeh Shrine